{{DISPLAYTITLE:C6H9NO6}}
The molecular formula C6H9NO6 (molar mass: 191.14 g/mol) may refer to:

 Carboxyglutamic acid
 Isosorbide mononitrate
 Nitrilotriacetic acid

Molecular formulas